Dromiaulis is a genus of moth in the family Cosmopterigidae. It contains only one species, Dromiaulis excitata, which is found in Peru.

References

External links
Natural History Museum Lepidoptera genus database

Cosmopteriginae